Break Time may refer to:

Break Time (EP), an EP by South Korean band U-KISS
Break Time (convenience store), a chain of convenience stores in Missouri operated by MFA Oil